Lee Tae-yeong (in North Korea spelled ) is the name of:
Lee Tai-young (1914–1998), South Korean female lawyer and judge
Lee Tea-young (born 1977), South Korean male handball player
Lee Tae-young (born 1987), South Korean male football player

See also
Lee (Korean surname), for other people with the same surname
Tae-young, for other people with the same given name